Gunnar Julius Skar (July 5, 1923 – October 12, 2012) was a Norwegian actor and theater director.

Career
During the 1940s, 1950s, and 1960s he worked as an actor and director at the New Theater and its successor, the Oslo New Theater. Skar also worked as a director for the Norwegian Theater and performed as an actor at the National Theatre in Oslo. He played two minor roles in the films To mistenkelige personer (1950) and Selkvinnen (1953).

Family
Skar was born in Skjeberg, the son of Andreas Barnholdt Skar (1892–1990) and Esther Ulrikke Skar (née Johannessen, 1894–1988). He died in 2012 and is buried in Oslo's Western Cemetery.

Filmography
1950: To mistenkelige personer
1953: Selkvinnen as Niclas, the bailiff's servant

References

External links
 
 Gunnar Skar at Filmfront
 Gunnar Skar at Sceneweb

1923 births
2012 deaths
20th-century Norwegian male actors
Norwegian theatre directors